Julian Emil Kurt Gressel (born December 16, 1993) is a professional soccer player who plays as a full-back for Major League Soccer club Vancouver Whitecaps. Born in Germany, he represents the United States national team. He began his career in Germany before moving to the United States in 2011. He then played college soccer for the Providence Friars for four seasons. In 2017, Gressel signed a contract with Major League Soccer and was selected in the MLS SuperDraft in the first round with the eighth overall pick by expansion side Atlanta United.

After his debut season with Atlanta United, Gressel was named the MLS Rookie of the Year for 2017. He then won his first championship, helping Atlanta United win MLS Cup in 2018. He also was part of Atlanta United sides that won the U.S. Open Cup and Campeones Cup in 2018 and 2019 respectively. Prior to the 2020 season, Gressel was traded to D.C. United.

Career

Youth 
Gressel was born in Neustadt. He began his footballing career by playing in the youth academy systems of 2. Bundesliga side, SpVgg Greuther Fürth in 2002. In 2009, Gressel left Greuther Fürth and began playing for the academy set-up of Quelle Fürth.

Gressel played senior-level football in the German regional fifth-tier, the Bayernliga. During the 2011–12 Bayernliga, Gressel had one goal and ten assists. The following season, Gressel played for TSV Neustadt/Aisch in the sixth tier, Landesliga Bayern-Nordwest, where Gressel notched three goals and 12 assists during the 2012–13 Landesliga Bayern-Nordwest campaign.

Collegiate 

Gressel signed a National Letter of Intent before the 2013 NCAA Division I men's soccer season to play for Providence College's men's soccer program. During the 2013 season, Gressel was an immediate starter, starting and playing in all 22 fixtures the Friars played in. Gressel scored on his collegiate debut on August 30, 2013, in a 3–2 victory over Quinnipiac. In his freshman season, the Friars reached the championship match of the 2013 Big East Men's Soccer Tournament, before losing 3–2 against Marquette. The Friars ultimately earned an at-large bid into the 2013 NCAA Division I Men's Soccer Championship, where they reached the second round before losing to the fifth-seeded, Maryland. Gressel finished his freshman year with five goals and four assists. He was also awarded with a spot on the 2013 All-Big East Conference Second Team, and on the All-Rookie Team.

During his sophomore and junior seasons, Gressel earned honors on the Big East Conference All-Tournament teams for both the 2014 and 2015 editions of the tournaments. Additionally, during his junior season, Gressell earned spots on the NSCAA Third Team All-Great Lakes Region and the Second Team All-Big East Conference.

Gressel had a breakout season during his senior year at Providence. He led the Friars in total points with 36, accumulating 15 goals and six assists his senior year. Gressel was also rewarded with the Golden Boot award for scoring the most goals during the 2016 NCAA Division I Men's Soccer Championship, during a quarterfinal run which saw Providence beat CAA Champions Delaware, upset top-seeded and Big Ten Champions Maryland, and defeat Big East rivals Creighton. In addition, Gressell was listed an NSCAA First Team All-American and a semifinalist for the Hermann Trophy. Gressel additionally earned All-Great Lakes First Team honors, All-Big East Conference First Team honors, part of the 2016 Big East Men's Soccer Tournament's first team, and the All-Tournament team for the Rhode Island Capital City Classic.

Professional 
Ahead of the 2017 MLS SuperDraft, Gressel signed a senior college contract with Major League Soccer. Per league policy the terms were not disclosed. On January 13, 2017, Gressel was selected by expansion side Atlanta United FC in the first round with the eighth overall pick. Gressel made his professional debut for Atlanta United on March 5 in a 1–2 loss against New York Red Bulls. Gressel won the 2017 MLS Rookie of the Year honors, playing mostly as a central midfielder for manager Tata Martino. In 2018, Gressel was a key player for the MLS Cup Champions, playing mostly as a right midfielder and right wingback. Gressel starting 33 matches and assisting 14 times in league play, forming a key relationship with striker Josef Martinez and becoming one of the best crossers in the league. Gressel contributed to another successful Atlanta in 2019 for new manager Frank de Boer, assisting 12 times.

On January 21, 2020, D.C. United acquired Gressel from Atlanta United for $750,000 in Targeted Allocation Money. Gressel made his debut for D.C. on February 29, 2020, in the season opener against the Colorado Rapids. Gressel scored his first goal for D.C. United on August 29 in a 1–4 loss against the Philadelphia Union. Gressel finished the 2021 season with 13 assists, the third most in the league.

On July 15, 2022, Gressel was traded to the Vancouver Whitecaps in exchange for up to $900,000 in General Allocation Money.

International 
On November 5, 2022, Gressel became a United States citizen. Gressel was called in to the United States Men's National Team in January 2023 by interim manager Anthony Hudson. Gressel started at right back on January 25 against Serbia, assisting former teammate Brandon Vazquez in a 1–2 loss.

Career statistics

Club

International

Honors 
Atlanta United
MLS Cup: 2018
U.S. Open Cup: 2019
Campeones Cup: 2019

Vancouver Whitecaps
Canadian Championship: 2022

Individual
MLS Rookie of the Year: 2017

References

External links 
 Providence College Profile
 

1993 births
Living people
People from Neustadt (Aisch)-Bad Windsheim
Sportspeople from Middle Franconia
American soccer players
United States men's international soccer players
German footballers
American people of German descent
German emigrants to the United States
All-American men's college soccer players
Association football forwards
Atlanta United FC draft picks
Atlanta United FC players
D.C. United players
Expatriate soccer players in the United States
Expatriate soccer players in Canada
Footballers from Bavaria
German expatriate footballers
German expatriate sportspeople in the United States
German expatriate sportspeople in Canada
Major League Soccer players
Providence Friars men's soccer players
Vancouver Whitecaps FC players